Miedź Legnica is a Polish professional football club, based in Legnica, Poland, that competes in the Polish Ekstraklasa. Miedź was founded in 1971. The club's manager is Grzegorz Mokry.

In 2018, Miedź Legnica achieved promotion to the top flight for the first time in club's history. After a three-year absence from the top flight, they were promoted again at the end of the 2021–22 season after winning the league.

Current squad

Out on loan

Honours

League 
 I liga:
Winners (2): 2017–18, 2021–22

Cups 
 Polish Cup:
Winners (1): 1991–92
 Polish Super Cup:
Runners-up (1): 1992

European competitions 
Miedź Legnica scores are given first in all scorelines.

Notable players 
Had international caps for their respective countries. Players listed in bold represented their countries while playing for Miedź.
Poland
 Grzegorz Bartczak (2013–2020)
 Andrzej Bledzewski (2011–2015)
 Marcin Burkhardt (2013–2014)
 Łukasz Garguła (2015–2019)
 Jarosław Gierejkiewicz (1991–1992)
 Tomasz Jarzębowski (2010–2011)
 Romuald Kujawa (1999–2001)
 Wojciech Łobodziński (2012–2019)
 Piotr Madejski (2011–2014)
 Mariusz Mowlik (2011–2014)
 Marcin Nowacki (2011–2014)
 Marcin Robak (2002–2005)
 Michał Stasiak (2015–2017)
 Bartosz Ślusarski (2015–2016)
 Łukasz Załuska (2019–2020)
Albania
 Enkeleid Dobi (2010)
Cape Verde
 Kadú Alves (2015)
Chile
 Ángelo Henríquez (2022–)
Curacao
 Jurich Carolina (2021–)
Croatia
 Mladen Bartulović (2017–2018)
Denmark
 Jens Martin Gammelby (2022–)
Dominican Republic
 Carlos Heredia (2019–2020)
 Carlos Julio Martínez (2021–)
Estonia
 Artjom Artjunin (2016)
 Henrik Ojamaa (2018–2020)
 Artur Pikk (2018–2020)
 Igor Subbotin (2016)
Finland
 Petteri Forsell (2016–2017, 2018–2019)
Haiti
 Kevin Lafrance (2014–2015)
Latvia
 Valērijs Šabala (2015–2016)
Lithuania
 Tadas Labukas (2015–2016)
Luxembourg
 Jan Ostrowski (2019–2020)
Montenegro
 Nemanja Mijušković (2019–)
Netherlands
 Luciano Narsingh (2022–)
Trinidad and Tobago
 Keon Daniel (2014–2017)

See also 
 Miedź Legnica II (reserve team)

References

External links
 
 Miedź Legnica – 90minut.pl 

 
Association football clubs established in 1971
1971 establishments in Poland
Legnica